Boischatel is a municipality in the Capitale-Nationale region of Quebec, Canada. The town was originally called Saint-Jean-de-Boischatel.

The town itself is located along the Montmorency River. Near the boundary with Beauport are the Montmorency Falls, where 35,000 litres of water per second fall from a height one-and-a-half times greater than that of Niagara Falls.

Demographics

Population trend:
 Population in 2021: 8231 (2016 to 2021 population change: 8.5%)
 Population in 2016: 7587 
 Population in 2011: 6465 
 Population in 2006: 5287
 Population in 2001: 4303
 Population in 1996: 4152
 Population in 1991: 3878

Private dwellings occupied by usual residents: 3,050 (total dwellings: 3,128)

First language:
 English as first language: 0.7%
 French as first language: 97.3%
 English and French as first language: 0.3%
 Other as first language: 1.4%

See also
Chenal de l'Île d'Orléans
Ferrée River
Montmorency River
Saint Lawrence River
List of municipalities in Quebec

References

External links

Municipalities in Quebec
Incorporated places in Capitale-Nationale